The Lehigh Mountain Hawks men's basketball team represents Lehigh University in Bethlehem, Pennsylvania in NCAA Division I competition. They have competed in the Patriot League since the circuit became an all-sport conference in 1990. After ending its independent status in 1974, they were a member of the East Coast Conference until 1990. Lehigh made their first NCAA Division I tournament in 1985, doing so by winning the conference tournament. With a 12-18 record, they became the first team to reach the Tournament with a record below .500. Its home games are played at Stabler Arena. The Mountain Hawks made their fifth appearance in the NCAA Division I men's basketball tournament in 2012. The Mountain Hawks are currently coached by Dr. Brett Reed.

The Mountain Hawks men's basketball team is best known for defeating the second seeded Duke Blue Devils in the 2012 NCAA Division I men's basketball tournament.

Seasons

 Lehigh voluntarily forfeited 13 wins (12 regular season, 1 Patriot League Tournament) during the 2004–05 season for the inadvertent use of an ineligible player.

 Due to the COVID-19 pandemic, the Patriot League for the 2020–21 season was temporarily divided into three regional mini-conferences based on geography. Each team played a 16-game regular-season schedule which included four matches against each regional opponent. As usual, listed standings position reflected by conference tournament seed.

Postseason tournaments

NCAA tournament results
The Mountain Hawks have appeared in five NCAA Tournaments. Its combined record is 1–5.

CBI results
The Mountain Hawks have appeared in one College Basketball Invitational (CBI). Its record is 0–1.

Retired numbers
Three Mountain Hawk players have had their numbers retired by the University.

NBA draft
McCollum was the first Lehigh player ever drafted.

References

External links